Ballıqaya or Ballykaya may refer to:
Ballıqaya, Agdam, Azerbaijan
Ballıqaya, Goranboy, Azerbaijan
Ballıqaya (Karahoundge), Goranboy, Azerbaijan
Ballıqaya, Qubadli, Azerbaijan